The Cologne Fine Art Award (German: Cologne-Fine-Art-Preis) was awarded annually as part of the art exposition ART Cologne. It was awarded by the Cologne Trade Fair Company (Kölner Messegesellschaft Köln Messe) and the Federal Association of German Art Publishers (Bundesverband Deutscher Kunstverleger e. V) . Eligible were reproducible works, such as art printing or photography. 

The prize consisted of 10,000 euros and a special exposition within the ART Cologne.

Recipients 
Source:

 1996 
 1997 Ottmar Hörl
 1998 Dieter Roth
 1999 Thomas Huber
 2000 Thomas Bayrle
 2001 Astrid Klein
 2002 Sigmar Polke
 2003 Jörg Sasse
 2004 Kupferstichkabinett Berlin
 2005 Thomas Schütte
 2006 
 2007 Gert & Uwe Tobias
 2008 Katharina Sieverding
 2009 Georg Baselitz
 2010 Andreas Schulze
 2011 Günther Uecker
 2012 Tony Cragg
 2013 Jürgen Klauke
 2014 Leiko Ikemura
 2015 Candida Höfer
 2016 
 2017 
 2018 Horst Antes

See also
 List of European art awards

References

Sources 
 Bundesverband Deutscher Kunstverleger e. V : German
Köln Messe : German

German art awards
Awards established in 1996